Bereznik is a rural locality (a village) in Kameshnikovskoye Rural Settlement, Sheksninsky District, Vologda Oblast, Russia. The population was 58 as of 2002.

Geography 
Bereznik is located 58 km north of Sheksna (the district's administrative centre) by road. Deryagino is the nearest rural locality.

References 

Rural localities in Sheksninsky District